Helmut van Emden is Emeritus Professor of Horticulture at the University of Reading. He is known for work on insect-plant interactions in agroecosystems.

Van Emden is a former President and Honorary Fellow of the Royal Entomological Society and former President of the Association of Applied Biology.

References

Fellows of the Royal Entomological Society
British entomologists
Living people
Year of birth missing (living people)
People from Dresden
Place of birth missing (living people)